Riegel Community Hospital, also known as Riegel Hospital, was an historic 1924 hospital in Trion, Georgia. It closed in 1975. It was added to the National Register of Historic Places on February 20, 2002. In 2010 the city of Trion sought to demolish the building, which was damaged by flooding and in need of roof repairs. It contained asbestos. The building was demolished.

The hospital was built by the Trion Manufacturing Co., a local denim mill, and served its workers; it was named after the mill's president, Benjamin Riegel. The property was donated to the city in the 1990s.

It was located at 194 Allgood Street at coordinates 34°32′31″N 85°18′46″W / 34.541944°N 85.312778°W / 34.541944; -85.312778

See also
National Register of Historic Places listings in Chattooga County, Georgia

References

Buildings and structures in Chattooga County, Georgia
National Register of Historic Places in Chattooga County, Georgia